Masley is a surname. Notable people with the surname include:

Frank Masley (1960–2016), American luger
Michael Masley (born 1952), American musician

See also
Malley
Massey (surname)
Mount Masley, a mountain of Victoria Land, Antarctica